Thesis Eleven: Critical Theory and Historical Sociology is a peer-reviewed academic journal that publishes six issues a year in the field of Sociology. The journal's editors are Peter Beilharz (Curtin University, Perth, Australia), Trevor Hogan (La Trobe University, Melbourne, Australia) and Peter Murphy (Monash University, Melbourne, Victoria). It has been in publication since 1980 and is currently published by SAGE Publications.

Scope
Thesis Eleven publishes civilizational analysis on alternative modernities. The journal is multidisciplinary and covers areas such as sociology, anthropology and philosophy. Thesis Eleven focuses on critical theories of modernity and aims to reflect the broad scope of social theory.

Abstracting and indexing
Thesis Eleven is abstracted and indexed in the following databases:
 Academic Complete
 Academic Premier
 SocINDEX
 SCOPUS
 ZETOC

External links

Thesis Eleven blog

SAGE Publishing academic journals
English-language journals
Sociology journals